The Acquacheta is a stream in the province of Forlì-Cesena, Romagna, northern Italy. An affluent of the Montone in San Benedetto in Alpe, it is famous because it was mentioned by Dante Alighieri in his Divine Comedy (Inferno, XVI, 94–102).

It is now a renowned attraction of the Foreste Casentinesi, Monte Falterona e Campigna National Park.

Rivers of the Province of Forlì-Cesena
Rivers of Italy